WIUJ (102.9 FM) was a non-commercial radio station licensed to serve Charlotte Amalie, U.S. Virgin Islands. The station was owned by Virgin Island Youth Development Radio, Inc. It aired a Variety format featuring jazz, classical, and Caribbean music, plus news, current events coverage, as well as live daily broadcasts of the Virgin Islands Senate.

WIUJ's studios and transmitter were located on the premises of WTJX-TV on St. Thomas, US Virgin Islands. WIUJ had been assigned these call letters by the Federal Communications Commission since it was originally licensed.

The station ceased operations on January 31, 2020, after more than 44 years on the air. Its license was cancelled February 4, 2020.

References

External links
 

IUJ
Radio stations established in 1975
Radio stations disestablished in 2020
1975 establishments in the United States Virgin Islands
2020 disestablishments in the United States Virgin Islands
Defunct radio stations in the United States
Variety radio stations in insular areas of the United States
IUJ
Charlotte Amalie, U.S. Virgin Islands